The All-Russian Confederation of Labour (Russian: Всероссийская конфедерация труда) (VKT) is a national trade union center in Russia. It was formed August 17, 1995, and has a membership of 1.27 million.

The VKT, along with the Confederation of Labour of Russia, publishes the Ob’edinennaya profsoyuznaya gazeta.

The VKT is affiliated with the International Trade Union Confederation, and the General Confederation of Trade Unions.

In April 2010, the VKT and the Confederation of Labour of Russia (KTR) merged. The President of the VKT, Boris Kravchenko, was appointed to the post of General Secretary of the KTR. Then, on May 15 of the same year, the seventh extraordinary congress of the VKT was held, at which it was decided to terminate the activities of the trade union association and join the Confederation of Labour of Russia.

References

External links
 vkt.org.ru official site.

International Trade Union Confederation
General Confederation of Trade Unions
National trade union centers of Russia
Trade unions established in 1995